Tai Po Sports Ground is a sports ground located in Tai Po, New Territories, Hong Kong. 

It was the home stadium of Hong Kong Premier League club Tai Po.

History
Tai Po Sports Ground staged its first ever Hong Kong First Division game on 30 September 2006, when Tai Po played South China. Despite losing 2–3, all 2,020 tickets for the match were sold out.

After the game, the stadium was determined to be unsuitable for future First Division games. Refurbishment work begun in 2007 to upgrade the facilities, including refurbishing the changing rooms, building corporate boxes, installing new goal posts and replanting the grass, such that Tai Po would be allowed play all of their home games during the 2007-08 season at the stadium. The work costed the Leisure and Cultural Services Department HK$1 million.

2007–08 season
On 3 August 2007, the Hong Kong Football Association agreed to allow Tai Po to play 9 games at the Tai Po Sports Ground in the 2007-08 season, regardless whether the games are home or away. There were likely to be other first division matches for two other clubs at the ground on the same days as well. But after the pre-season pitch examination, the HKFA decided that it was not up to standard for First Division matches and thus no matches were to be held at the ground.

2008–09 season

With a potential 13 teams competing in the 2008-09 season, the HKFA determined that Mong Kok Stadium's pitch would not be able to handle the large number of games scheduled there and once again, suggested the use of Tai Po Sports Ground for Tai Po's home games. The HKFA's schedule for the first half of the 2008-09 season has shown that Tai Po has been granted the rights to play six of its home games here.

On 13 September 2008, Tai Po played its second ever home game at the sports ground against Sheffield United. 1,136 fans attended the game. Tai Po won 2–1. On 27 December 2008, Tai Po played host to South China and 2,520 spectators attended the game, setting a new record for the sports ground.

Transport
The stadium is located near Tai Wo station, a 10–15 minute walk away.

Gallery

References

External links

 Official website

Tai Po
Sports venues in Hong Kong
Football venues in Hong Kong
1992 establishments in Hong Kong